Acrapex roseotincta is a species of moth of the family Noctuidae first described by George Hampson in 1910. It is found in Sri Lanka.

The wingspan is about 22 mm.

Description
Head and thorax ochreous tinged with brown; abdomen ochreous white. Forewing pale ochreous yellow faintly tinged with rufous and the veins slightly streaked with rufous; a slight blackish streak below the basal half of the cell; some black scales at the lower angle of the cell; an oblique postmedial series of black points on veins 6 to 1; an oblique diffused rufous fascia from termen below apex to vein 3; a slight brown terminal line; cilia yellowish white with a faint brownish line through them. Hindwing white faintly tinged with ochreous; the underside white with the costal area tinged with ochreous.

References

Xyleninae
Moths of Sri Lanka